Adrian Mutu (born 8 January 1979) is a Romanian professional football manager and former player, who is in charge of Liga I club Rapid București. During his playing career, he was deployed as a forward or an attacking midfielder.

Mutu started his career playing two years for Argeș Pitești and half a season for Dinamo București, before joining Inter Milan in Italy midway through the 1999–2000 Serie A. After only ten games with the Nerazzurri, he left for Hellas Verona and then Parma, for which he scored 39 goals in the next three years. His excellent form brought him a €22.5 million transfer to Chelsea and a nomination for the Ballon d'Or in 2003. Following a failed drug test, he was released and returned to Serie A to join Juventus. After the 2006 Italian football scandal and the relegation of Juventus to Serie B, Mutu decided to join Fiorentina, where he played consistently for the next five years. He then had a season at Cesena and French club Ajaccio, before returning to his native country with Petrolul Ploiești in 2014. After two more brief spells with Pune City and ASA Târgu Mureș, Mutu retired from professional football in 2016.

A controversial figure off the field, Mutu received widespread attention following a positive test for cocaine while playing for Chelsea in 2005, which resulted in his immediate release from the club, a subsequent seven-month ban from the Football Association, and Mutu later being ordered to pay £15.2 million in damages to his former employers, the largest financial penalty in FIFA history. He has unsuccessfully tried to appeal the fine numerous times, and was banned for a second time in 2010 following a positive test for sibutramine while at Fiorentina.

From his international debut in 2000, Mutu played 77 matches for the Romania national team and scored 35 goals, a joint record alongside Gheorghe Hagi. He was included in the country's squads at the European Championship in 2000 and 2008. A four-time winner of the Romanian Footballer of the Year award, only Gheorghe Popescu and Gheorghe Hagi have received the award more times, with six and seven wins, respectively.

Club career

Early career
Mutu began his professional career with Argeș Pitești and Dinamo București.

Verona
In 2000, Mutu was sold by Inter to Verona in co-ownership deal, for 7,500 million lire (€3,873,427). The Veneto side also signed Massimo Oddo, Mauro Camoranesi (later a teammate at Juventus), and young rising star Alberto Gilardino (later a teammate at Fiorentina) that season. As Verona faced fellow strugglers Bari on matchday 18 in February 2001, Mutu came off the bench with Verona down a man and trailing 0–1 and scored two goals, inspiring Verona to a 3–2 victory. The club narrowly avoided relegation through winning the relegation tie-breaker playoffs. In June 2001, Verona bought Mutu outright, for 5,100 million lire. (€2,633,930)

Chelsea
On 12 August 2003, Chelsea paid Parma €22.5m (around £15.8m) for Mutu's transfer as part of new owner Roman Abramovich's spending spree, on a five-year contract. He made his debut 11 days later, and scored the winning goal from distance in a 2–1 home victory against Leicester City, and with two in a 4–2 win at Stamford Bridge against Tottenham Hotspur on 13 September, he totalled four goals in his opening three games.

In the 2004–05 season, Mutu had a difficult relationship with the club's new manager José Mourinho, with each accusing the other of lying about whether the player was injured for a 2006 World Cup qualifying match against the Czech Republic. In September 2004, Mutu was banned from football for 7 months until May 2005 after testing positive for cocaine use.

Breach of contract issue
Chelsea started to seek compensation from Mutu in early 2005. The Football Association Premier League Appeals Committee decided that the player had committed a breach of his contract without just cause which made Chelsea eligible to claim the compensation. Mutu started his first appeal to the Court of Arbitration for Sport (CAS) in April 2005 but the case was dismissed in December 2005. On 11 May 2006, Chelsea applied to FIFA for an award of compensation against Mutu. In particular, the club requested that the FIFA Dispute Resolution Chamber (DRC) award compensation to the club following Mutu's breaching the employment contract without just cause. However, on 26 October, the DRC decided that it did not have jurisdiction to make a decision in the dispute and that the claim by the club was therefore not admissible. On 22 December, Chelsea lodged a new appeal before the CAS seeking the annulment of the DRC's decision. On 21 May 2007, a CAS panel allowed the club's appeal, set aside the DRC's decision, and referred the matter back to the DRC, "which does have jurisdiction to determine and impose the appropriate sporting sanction and/or order for compensation, if any, arising out of the dispute" between the Club and the Player,"

On 7 May 2008, the FIFA Dispute Resolution Chamber ordered Mutu to pay €17,173,990 in compensation to his former club, Chelsea FC, for breach of contract. This included €16,500,000 for the unamortised portion of the transfer fee paid to Parma, €307,340 for the unamortised portion of the sign-on fee (received by Mutu), and €366,650 for the unamortised portion of the fee to the Agent, but was not to take into account the determination of the damages for the amounts already paid by the club to the player (consideration for services rendered) or the remaining value of the employment contract (valued at €10,858,500). Mutu had to pay within 30 days after being informed of the decision in August 2008. Mutu lodged an appeal with the Court of Arbitration for Sport for the second time, but on 31 July 2009, that court dismissed his appeal, and Mutu was ordered to pay Chelsea the amount plus interest of 5% p.a. starting on 12 September 2008 until the effective date of payment; the matter was submitted to the FIFA Disciplinary Committee for its determination. In addition, Mutu had to pay the costs of arbitration for both parties, including CHF 50,000 to Chelsea. The fine was the highest ever levied by FIFA.

Mutu could have been banned from football by FIFA if he did not pay the fine although some lawyers disputed this. Mutu started his third appeal, this time to the Federal Supreme Court of Switzerland, in October 2009, but on 14 June 2010 this appeal was also dismissed with Mutu again being ordered to pay Chelsea €17m in damages. In 2013, FIFA DRC decided in a new ruling that Livorno and Juventus were also jointly liable to pay compensation; both clubs immediately appealed to the Court of Arbitration for Sport. On 21 January 2015 the Court of Arbitration for Sport annulled the FIFA DRC ruling; Mutu remained the sole party to pay the compensation.

In 2018, European Court of Human Rights rejected Mutu's appeal against CAS 2015 ruling.

Juventus
Mutu signed a five-year contract with the Italian club Juventus on 12 January 2005, despite still being banned from football until 18 May. As Juventus had no available room to buy another non-EU player from abroad, the move also involved fellow Serie A club Livorno, who signed the player and contemporaneously sold him to Juventus.

Fiorentina

On 8 July 2006, Fiorentina announced that they had signed Mutu for €8 million.

In July 2008, A.S. Roma made a reported €18 to 20 million offer to sign him outright, but Mutu hinted that he may remain in Florence and eventually signed a new contract reported last to 2012.

On 29 January 2010, it was reported that Mutu failed a doping test after a Coppa Italia match against Lazio match nine days earlier, in which he scored twice in to help Fiorentina win 3–2. The INOC was requested to hand Mutu a one-year ban by the Italian anti-doping prosecutor. He eventually received a nine-month ban on 19 April, which was later reduced to six months and ended on 29 October. After the ban finished, Mutu was suspended by the club due to breach of contract (AWOL) on 7 January 2011. After such events, Mutu publicly apologised to the club and parted company with his agent Victor Becali; on 3 February 2011 Fiorentina announced the player was reinstated into the first team with immediate effect.

Later career
On 23 June 2011, it was officially announced that Cesena had signed Mutu on a two-year contract. On 15 January, Mutu scored two goals versus Novara and took his tally to 101 goals in Serie A. After a couple of unconvincing games, on 11 April, Mutu scored a goal against Genoa, to eventually earn a draw for Cesena.

In the summer of 2012, after Cesena relegated from Serie A, the two parties ended the contract by mutual consent.

After his release from Cesena, Mutu signed a new contract with AC Ajaccio of the French Ligue 1 on 28 August 2012. He said that he favoured the Italian culture on Corsica, dismissed claims that he was preparing for retirement, and stated that he would score more goals than Zlatan Ibrahimović of Paris Saint-Germain. Club president Alain Orsoni said that Mutu was the highest-profile player to come to Corsica since Johnny Rep joined SC Bastia in 1978.

After his previous season's goal haul was enough to keep Ajaccio in Ligue 1, Mutu's second season saw him play just 9 games and not score, before terminating his contract on 14 January 2014 alongside compatriot Ștefan Popescu.

Later that day he was presented at Petrolul Ploiești in front of 10,000 fans. He was signed by his former international teammate, Cosmin Contra. In the summer of 2014, Mutu scored both home and away against Viktoria Plzeň in the UEFA Europa League third qualifying round, a double which Petrolul impressively won 5–2 on aggregate.

On 26 September 2014, Petrolul announced that the club had ended the contract between the two parties.

On 30 July 2015, Mutu signed as the marquee player for Indian Super League club FC Pune City.

In January 2016, Mutu returned to Romania with ASA 2013 Târgu Mureș, having been assured by national manager Anghel Iordănescu that he could have a place in the UEFA Euro 2016 squad if he played in a better league than India's.

International career

Euro 2000
He played in three of four matches at the UEFA Euro 2000, where Romania reached the quarterfinals for the first time.

Euro 2008
Mutu scored Romania's only goal of Euro 2008 in the 55th minute of their second match against Italy, however in the same match he had a second-half penalty saved by Italian goalkeeper Gianluigi Buffon, which could have sent Italy out of the competition and would have guaranteed Romania a spot in the quarter finals. The game finished 1–1.

Since 2009, Romania's national team coach Răzvan Lucescu has had reservations about calling him up, because Mutu was revealed to be consuming alcohol after a match with Serbia in World Cup 2010 Qualifications. Because of poor results and fan pressure, Răzvan Lucescu was forced to call him up again. Mutu scored a brace in his first game back, a 3–1 win over Luxembourg on 29 March 2011, Romania's first win of the qualifiers. He also scored once in the next game, a 3–0 win over Bosnia and Herzegovina on 3 June 2011.

International ban
On 11 August 2011, Mutu and his teammate Gabriel Tamaş were excluded from the Romania national team after they were found drinking at a bar on the night of 10 August, while their teammates were playing in a friendly match against San Marino. However, after only three games, their suspension was lifted. On 21 November 2013, Mutu was barred from playing on the national team after he posted an image of manager Victor Piţurcă as Mr. Bean on Facebook.

Style of play
A highly skilful and creative player, with an eye for goal, who was, however, troubled by off-field issues throughout his career, Mutu was capable of playing in several offensive positions, and was used as a supporting forward, as a main striker, as a winger, and also as an attacking midfielder, due to his ability to both score and assist goals. Often compared to compatriot Gheorghe Hagi, in his prime, Mutu was a quick and mobile player, with excellent technical skills and dribbling ability, and was also an accurate set-piece and penalty-kick taker. Despite his talent, he was often prone to injury and accused of inconsistency throughout his career, and was also notorious for his temperamental character and behaviour on the pitch; because of this, he was often regarded as not having lived up to his true potential.

Managerial career
Mutu began his managerial career in April 2018 when he was appointed as manager of Romanian Liga I club Voluntari, signing a two-year contract following the departure of former manager Claudiu Niculescu. However, his tenure lasted just two months. Although he managed to save the club from relegation, winning a play-off against Chindia Târgoviște, the club's board of directors chose to fire Mutu on 14 June. Club president Dan Leasa disagreed with the board's decision and also left the club.

In July 2018, Mutu was signed by United Arab Emirates club Al Wahda to be the manager of their reserve team.

Personal life
Mutu was in a relationship with Israeli model and actress Moran Atias during the early 2000s.

From 2001 to 2003, he was married to the Romanian actress and television presenter Alexandra Dinu with whom he has a son, Mario (2002).

In 2005, he married Consuelo Matos Gómez, a Dominican model, at the Romanian Orthodox Scala Celli church in Rome. They have two daughters, Adriana (2006) and Maya Vega (2008). They got divorced in 2015.

In 2016, he married Sandra Bachici, a former model.They have a son, Tiago Adrian Mutu (2017).

Career statistics

Club

International

Scores and results list Romania's goal tally first, score column indicates score after each Mutu goal.

Managerial statistics

Honours 

Dinamo București
 Divizia A: 1999–00

Juventus
 Serie A: 2004–05, 2005–06 
 Supercoppa Italiana runner-up: 2005

Individual
 Gazeta Sporturilor Romanian Footballer of the Year: 2003, 2005, 2007, 2008
 Guerin d'Oro: 2007
 Coppa Italia top scorer: 2009–10
 Fiorentina All-time XI

Records
 The second player to score in European competitions with seven different teams.

References

Further reading 
Parks, Tim (2002) A Season with Verona: Travels Around Italy in Search of Illusion, National Character and Goals. Arcade Publishing.

External links

 
 
 
 

1979 births
Living people
People from Argeș County
Sportspeople from Pitești
Romanian footballers
Association football forwards
FC Argeș Pitești players
FC Dinamo București players
Inter Milan players
Hellas Verona F.C. players
Parma Calcio 1913 players
Chelsea F.C. players
Juventus F.C. players
ACF Fiorentina players
A.C. Cesena players
AC Ajaccio players
FC Petrolul Ploiești players
FC Pune City players
ASA 2013 Târgu Mureș players
Liga I players
Serie A players
Premier League players
Ligue 1 players
Indian Super League players
Romanian expatriate footballers
Romanian expatriate sportspeople in England
Romanian expatriate sportspeople in Italy
Romanian expatriate sportspeople in France
Romanian expatriate sportspeople in India
Expatriate footballers in India
Expatriate footballers in England
Expatriate footballers in Italy
Expatriate footballers in France
Romania international footballers
UEFA Euro 2000 players
UEFA Euro 2008 players
Romanian sportspeople in doping cases
Doping cases in association football
Indian Super League marquee players
Romanian football managers
FC Voluntari managers
FC U Craiova 1948 managers
FC Rapid București managers
Association football coaches